The Heat: A Kitchen (R)evolution is a Canadian documentary film, directed by Maya Gallus and released in 2018. The film profiles several women chefs, exploring the sexist double standards in the restaurant industry that get women sidelined, or stigmatized as "difficult", if they are as ambitious or assertive as their male peers.

Chefs appearing in the film are Anne-Sophie Pic, Angela Hartnett, Anita Lo, Victoria Blamey, Amanda Cohen, Suzanne Barr and Charlotte Langley.

The film premiered in April 2018 at the Hot Docs Canadian International Documentary Festival, and had several international film festival screenings before being broadcast by TVOntario.

The film was nominated for the Donald Brittain Award for Best Social or Political Documentary Program, and John Tran was nominated for Best Photography in a Documentary Program or Factual Series, at the 7th Canadian Screen Awards.

References

External links

2018 films
2018 documentary films
Canadian documentary television films
2010s English-language films
English-language Canadian films
2010s Canadian films
Documentary films about women
Documentary films about food and drink